Henry Tilson (bapt. 1577 – 1655), Bishop of Elphin, was an Irish Anglican churchman.

Life
The son of Henry Tilson, he was born in England at Midgley, in Yorkshire.  He graduated BA at Balliol College, Oxford in 1597, became a fellow of University College in 1599, and graduated MA 1601. He spent periods as rector of Stanmer, Sussex, and vicar of Rochdale in Lancashire.

Tilson went to Ireland as chaplain to Thomas Wentworth, 1st Earl of Strafford, the Lord Deputy, and received preferment. He was Dean of Christ Church, Dublin from 1634 to 1639; Archdeacon of Connor from 1635 until 1639; and Bishop of Elphin from his consecration on 23 September 1639 for the rest of his life.

In 1645 Tilson left Ireland, to avoid the insurgency that followed the 1641 Irish Rebellion. He went to Soothill Hall, in Yorkshire, and the Southwell family. He continued to preach, at Cumberworth, and died at Soothill Hall on 31 March 1655. He was buried at Dewsbury.

References

1655 deaths
Deans of Christ Church Cathedral, Dublin
Archdeacons of Connor
Anglican bishops of Elphin
Year of birth unknown